1979–80 saw the fourth edition of the Saudi Premier League.

The league title was won by Al-Nassr for the second time.

Newly promoted side Al Ohud were relegated along with Al-Wahda for the first time, meaning that the city of Mecca would not be represented in the top flight for the first time since the league began.

Stadia and locations

League table

Promoted: Al Jabalain, Al-Riyadh.
Full records are not known at this time

External links 
 RSSSF Stats
 Saudi Arabia Football Federation
 Saudi League Statistics
 Article writer for Saleh Al-Hoireny - Al-Jazirah newspaper 20-08-2010

Saudi Premier League seasons
Saudi
1979–80 in Saudi Arabian football